Manuel Pizarro is a Portuguese politician of the Socialist Party who has been serving as Minister of Health in Prime Minister António Costa's third cabinet. He previously was a Member of the European Parliament from 2019 to 2022. to 2022.

Political career
Pizzaro was a Member of the European Parliament from the 2019 European elections. In parliament, he served on the Committee on Employment and Social Affairs and the Committee on Fisheries.

In addition to his committee assignments, Pizzaro was part of the parliament's delegation for relations with Brazil. He was also a member of the European Parliament Intergroup on Trade Unions and the URBAN Intergroup.

Other activities 
 UNITE – Parliamentary Network to End HIV/AIDS, Viral Hepatitis and Other Infectious Diseases, Member (since 2019)

References

Living people
MEPs for Portugal 2019–2024
Socialist Party (Portugal) MEPs
Socialist Party (Portugal) politicians
1964 births
Health ministers of Portugal
21st-century Portuguese politicians